The Three-Day Novel Contest is an annual Canadian literary contest conducted in September of each year. The contest, which is open to writers from anywhere in the world, gives entrants three days to write a novel. Writers are permitted to plan and outline their novel in advance, but the actual writing cannot begin until the contest's opening date, which is traditionally on Labour Day weekend.

The entries are then judged by a panel, which announces its winning selection early in the following year, and the winning novel is published by a Canadian independent publisher.

The contest began in a Vancouver bar in 1977, where a handful of writers sat around bragging about their literary prowess. The tough-talk eventually led to a challenge: Go home and write an entire novel in three days. None of them managed to produce a book that first year, but the next Labour Day weekend the challenge was thrown down again, to an even larger group. The challenge was repeated the following year—and this time it produced a novel worth publishing: Dr. Tin  by Toronto playwright Tom Walmsley. From that point forward, a small publishing house named Arsenal Pulp Press ran the contest, took it international, and published one winner every year.

In the late 1980s, Arsenal Pulp passed the torch to Anvil Press, which, 15 years later, passed it on to another small press. That publisher folded the same year, which seemed to mean the end of the contest.  But a couple of fans of the Three-Day Novel agreed to rescue it; they put in hundreds of volunteer hours to set it up and manage it as an independent organization, which they maintained for nine years. In 2013, they passed on management of the contest to the Geist Foundation and the job of publishing the winning novel to Anvil Press.

In 2006, the Three-Day Novel Contest became the subject of a reality television program under the auspices of BookTelevision, a Canadian specialty channel produced by CHUM Limited.  Twelve writers lived and worked in Chapters Southpoint, a bookstore in Edmonton, Alberta, composing novels before bemused customers and a national audience.

About five to six hundred writers enter the contest every year, about two-thirds of whom manage to complete and submit a novel. To date, the contest has had two repeat winners: Bradley Harris, a writer from Memphis, Tennessee, won in 1998 with Ruby Ruby and again in 2012 with Thorazine Beach, while Shannon Mullally was co-winner with Meghan Austin in 2004 for Love Block and won as a solo writer in 2017 for The Second Detective.

One winning novel, Marc Diamond's Momentum, was also a shortlisted finalist for the Books in Canada First Novel Award.

Winners

 1979 – Tom Walmsley, Dr. Tin
 1981 – Ray Serwylo, Accordion Lessons
 1982 – bpNichol, Still
 1983 – Jeff Doran, This Guest of Summer
 1984 – Jim Curry, Nothing So Natural
 1985 – Marc Diamond, Momentum
 1986 – Candas Jane Dorsey and Nora Abercrombie, Hardwired Angel
 1987 – James Dunn, Starting Small
 1988 – Pat Dobie, Pawn to Queen
 1989 – Stephen E. Miller, Wastefall
 1990 – Bill Dodds, O Father
 1992 – Hayden Trenholm, Circle of Birds
 1993 – Steve Lundin and Mitch Parry, Stolen Voices/Vacant Rooms
 1995 – Loree Harrell, Body Speaking Words
 1996 – Todd Klinck, Tacones
 1997 – P. G. Tarr, The Underwood
 1998 – Bradley Harris, Ruby Ruby
 1999 – Bonnie Bowman, Skin
 2000 – Chris Millis, Small Apartments
 2001 – David Zimmerman, Socket
 2002 – Geoffrey Bromhead, Struck
 2004 – Meghan Austin and Shannon Mullally, Love Block
 2005 – Jan Underwood, Day Shift Werewolf
 2006 – Brendan McLeod, The Convictions of Leonard McKinley
 2007 – John Kupferschmidt, In the Garden of Men
 2008 – Jason Rapczynski, The Videographer
 2009 – Mark Sedore, Snowmen
 2010 – Jennifer K. Chung, Terroryaki! ( / ebook )
 2011 – Kayt Burgess, Heidegger Stairwell ( / ebook )
 2012 – Bradley Harris, Thorazine Beach
 2013 – Rachel Slansky, Moss-Haired Girl
 2014 – Craig Savel, Traversing Leonard’s Bubbles
 2015 – Doug Diaczuk, Chalk
 2016 – Mark Wagstaff, Attack of the Lonely Hearts
 2017 – Shannon Mullally, The Second Detective
 2018 – Daniel Sanders, The Loop
 2019 – Doug Diaczuk, Just Like a Real Person
 2020 – Emma Côté, Unrest

See also
 Lune Spark Young Writers' Short Story Contest
 National Kids-in-Print Book Contest for Students
 National Novel Writing Month
 PBS Kids Writers Contest

References

External links
 Three-Day Novel Contest

Awards established in 1979
1979 establishments in British Columbia
Canadian fiction awards
Literary awards honoring unpublished books or writers